Brian Hayes (born 2001) is an Irish Gaelic footballer and hurler who plays for club side St Finbarr's and at senior level with the Cork county hurling team. He usually lines out as a forward.

Career

Hayes first played Gaelic football and hurling at underage and juvenile levels with St. Finbarr's, before joining the respective senior teams as a dual player in 2020. He won a Cork PSFC title after a defeat of Clonakilty in 2021, before later winning a Munster SCFC title. Hayes added a Cork PSHC title to his collection after a win over Blackrock in the 2022 final.

Hayes's inter-county career began with the Cork under-20 hurling team that won consecutive All-Ireland U20C titles after defeats of Dublin in 2020 and Galway in 2021. He also lined out with the Cork under-20 football team and captained the team to the Munster U20FC title in 2021. Hayes was a part of the Cork senior football team in 2022, and made a number of championship appearances. He later joined the Cork senior hurling team.

Career statistics

Honours

St. Finbarr's
Munster Senior Club Football Championship: 2021
Cork Premier Senior Hurling Championship: 2022
Cork Premier Senior Football Championship: 2021

Cork
All-Ireland Under-20 Hurling Championship: 2020, 2021
Munster Under-20 Hurling Championship: 2020, 2021
Munster Under-20 Football Championship: 2021 (c)

References

2001 births
Living people
St Finbarr's hurlers
St Finbarr's Gaelic footballers
Cork inter-county hurlers
Cork inter-county Gaelic footballers
Dual players